Air Support Command of the Royal Air Force was formed on 1 August 1967 by the redesignation of Transport Command. Its change of name reflected the change of emphasis of the Command from solely transporting materials and manpower around the world to providing general support to RAF operations around the world.

The result of this broader role meant that Air Support Command, unlike its predecessor Transport Command, possessed strike aircraft such as Hawker Hunters. With the contraction of the RAF, it only lasted a short time as a command, and it was absorbed into Strike Command on 1 September 1972 forming No. 38 Group and No. 46 Group within Strike Command. The former was designated as a tactical support and the latter as a strategic support group.

Commanders in Chief
Commanders-in-Chief included:
1 August 1967 - Air Marshal Sir Thomas Prickett 
1 July 1968 - Air Marshal Sir Lewis Hodges 
1 October 1970 - Air Marshal Sir Harry Burton

See also

 List of Royal Air Force commands

References

|-
 
 

Air Support Command
Transport units and formations of the Royal Air Force
Military units and formations established in 1967